"Turn This Thing Around" is a single by El Presidente released on 6 February 2006.

When originally featured on their debut album, it featured Alan Thorton on drums, but was re-recorded in late 2005  with the official El Presidente line-up. The new version has a more Japanese sound to it, and the video was also shot in Japan.

When released, two live versions from the Xfm Scotland opening gig, and Edinburgh liquid rooms were made available through the official El Presidente website. On the Monday of its release, it was at number 30 in the midweek chart, but slipped down each day and fell to number 39 by Sunday.

Track listings

First CD 
 "Turn This Thing Around"
 "Raspberry Beret"

Second CD
 "Turn This Thing Around"
 "Get By"
 "Turn This Thing Around" (acoustic)

Coloured (Red) 7"
A. "Turn This Thing Around"
B. "Rocket" (acoustic)

Charts
No.39/79---England
No.11 Gone---Scotland
No.94 Gone---Japan

EP version

A Japanese release, this EP features B-Sides, two versions of "Turn This Thing Around" (new and old) and the Japanese-flavoured video. It was an official Japanese release, but only reached number 94 in the singles chart in Japan.

2006 singles
El Presidente (band) songs
2005 songs